General Cabrera is a city located in the Juárez Celman Department in the Province of Córdoba in central Argentina.

References

Populated places in Córdoba Province, Argentina
Populated places established in 1893
1893 establishments in Argentina